Yongjie Jessica Zhang is an American mechanical engineer. She is the George Tallman Ladd and Florence Barrett Ladd Professor of mechanical engineering and, by courtesy, of biomedical engineering at Carnegie Mellon University. She is the Editor-in-Chief of Engineering with Computers.

Contributions
Zhang's research involves geometric modeling, mesh generation, image processing, finite element method and isogeometric analysis.
She has applied her research for biomedicine and in particular for analysing blood vessels and neurons,
as well as to ship design and the design of fiber-reinforced composite building materials.

Education
Zhang is originally from Henan, China, and earned a bachelor's degree in automotive engineering and a master's degree in engineering mechanics at Tsinghua University. She then moved to the University of Texas at Austin, where she earned a second master's degree in aerospace engineering and engineering mechanics, and a Ph.D. from the University of Texas Institute for Computational Engineering and Sciences (now Oden Institute) under the supervision of Chandrajit Bajaj.

After staying on at the University of Texas for postdoctoral studies with Bajaj and Thomas J.R. Hughes, she joined the mechanical engineering department at Carnegie Mellon in 2007.

Recognition
Zhang is the recipient of Simons Visiting Professorship from Mathematisches Forschungsinstitut Oberwolfach of Germany (2019), US Presidential Early Career Award for Scientists and Engineers (2012), NSF CAREER Award (2012) and Office of Naval Research Young Investigator Award (2010). The US Association for Computational Mechanics (USACM) awarded Zhang their Gallagher Young Investigator Medal (2013), "for pioneering research in high-fidelity geometric modeling and mesh generation with broad interdisciplinary finite element applications in computational biomedicine, material sciences and engineering". At CMU, she received David P. Casasent Outstanding Research Award (2020), George Tallman Ladd and Florence Barrett Ladd Professorship (2019), Clarence H. Adamson Career Faculty Fellow in Mechanical Engineering (2014), Donald L. & Rhonda Struminger Faculty Fellow (2011), and George Tallman Ladd Research Award (2010). She is a Fellow of Solid Modeling Association (SMA, 2021), American Institute for Medical and Biological Engineering (AIMBE, 2020), American Society of Mechanical Engineers (ASME, 2019), USACM (2019), and Executive Leadership in Academic Technology, Engineering and Science (ELATES) at Drexel (2017-2018).

Zhang served on the Executive Council of USACM and the General Council of International Association for Computational Mechanics (IACM). In USACM, she chaired the Technical Thrust Area of Isogeometric Analysis and is the founding chair of the Female Researchers Group. She chaired the Executive Committee of SMA where she initialized the Advisory Board and launched two new awards to recognize outstanding junior and mid-career researchers: Young Investigator Award and SMA Fellow. In addition to the Editor-in-Chief of Engineering with Computers, she also serves on the editorial board or is an associate editor of several journals such as Computer Methods in Applied Mechanics and Engineering, Computer-Aided Design and Computer Aided Geometric Design.

Selected publications

Book

Research papers

. Best paper at SPM 2015.
. Best paper at CompIMAGE 2016.

References

External links
Home page

Year of birth missing (living people)
Living people
American mechanical engineers
Chinese mechanical engineers
Tsinghua University alumni
Cockrell School of Engineering alumni
Researchers in geometric algorithms
Engineers from Henan
Chinese emigrants to the United States
American academics of Chinese descent